

A 

 Agrasain Boys' School
Agrasain Balika Siksha Sadan
 Augustine's Public School
 Al-Ameen Mission

B 

 Bally Nischinda Chittaranjan Vidyalaya
 Begri Girls High School
 Beldubi High School
 Bharat Academy &Sciences

D 

 Divine Mercy School
 Don Bosco School

Delhi Public School, Howrah

H 

 Holy Family Convent School
 Howrah Ramkrishnapur High School
 Howrah St. John's High School
 Howrah Sangha Adarsha Balika Vidyalaya
 Howrah Shiksha Sadan Boys' School

I 

 Ideal Public School

J 

 Jagacha High School
 Jagriti Hindu Vidyamandir
 Julien Day School, Howrah

K 

 Kanaipur Sriguru High School
 Kanduah Mahakali High School
 Keshabpur High School
 Khila Gopimohan Siksha Sadan
 Kolorah High School

L 

 Little Star High School
 Lyceum English Medium School

M 

 Maria's Day School
 M. C. Kejriwal Vidyapeeth

O 

 Oxford High School

P 

 Painting School of Fine Arts, Podrah, Podrah Board Primary School, Andul Road, Near Westbank hospital, Dist. – Howrah, Pin – 711109, West Bengal, India.
 P. P. Memorial Academy

R 

 Ramakrishna Mission Shilpayatana
 Ratnakar North Point School
 Rose Bud School

S 
 S. E. Railway Mixed High School ( English Medium )
 Sahapur Harendranath Vidyapith
 Salkia Vikram Vidyalaya
 Santragachi Kedarnath Institution (Girls)
 Santragachi Kedarnath Institution, Howrah
 Shree Jain Vidyalaya, Howrah
 Shree Jain Vidyalaya for Girls, Howrah
 Sibpur Hindu Girls High School
 Sibpur S.S.P.S Vidyalaya
 Sister Nivedita Institute
 South End Centre ( E. M. ) School
 Sri Ramkrishna Sikshalaya
 St. Aloysius Orphanage & Day School Howrah
 St. Ann's Day School
 St. Agnes' Convent School
 St. Denis School
 St. Dominic Savio School
 St. Helen's School
 St. Joseph Day School
 St. Mary's Convent School
 St. Paul's Educational Institution
 St. Thomas' Church School, Howrah
 St. Thomas' High School, Dassnagar
 Sudhir Memorial Institute Liluah
 Sunrise English Medium School

T 

 Tarasundari Balika Vidyabhaban

V 

 Vikramshila Academy
 Vivekananda Institution

References 

 
 

Howrah
Schools in Howrah
Schools in Howrah district